Clogs have traditionally been used in Turkish bath houses to protect the foot from dirty water and soap.  The earlier form were called "nalins" and originated during the Ottoman period.  Nalins came to be artistic objects which indicated the wearer's social standing.  As domestic baths became more common the rituals of the bath house declined and nalins were replaced with the simpler "takunya".  Takunya are also worn outside of the bath house.  Since 1960 takunya have in their turn been replaced by plastic slippers which are lighter and quieter.

Nalin

A nalin was based on a wooden sole supported on wooden plates under the heel and ball of the foot and carved from a single piece.  A strap secured the nalin to the foot.  The base was carved from a hardwood such as plane, box, ebony, walnut or sandalwood. The base was then embellished with precious metals or inlaid with mother-of-pearl or tortoise shell.  The strap was of leather or fabric with jewels and embroidery.

In 1898 a price of five guineas (£5.5s or £5.25 ) was quoted in Notes and Queries for a pair of Nalins.

The height of the plates and the quality of the embellishments was determined by the status of the wearer. Enderûnlu Fâzıl's 18th century painting of a bathhouse shows one finely dressed woman with very high nalins whilst the majority of subjects have much lower footwear. Nalin were often part of a woman's dowry. Babies were sometimes given miniature versions as gifts.

Although mostly associated with hammans or bath houses, they were also worn in stone houses, konaks and palaces.

Turkish nalins are claimed to have influences Venetian chopines which were similarly tall clogs.

Takunya
Takunya have a lower sole with no plates, the heel is raised on a solid block giving a clear instep.  Generally they are made from Oriental Hornbeam.  Like the nalin a strap passes over the foot to secure it.  The soles have a profile similar to a Träskor or an English clog, but with a simple fabric strap over the front of the foot.  They are produced by machine and then the treads from used tyres are nailed to the bottom of the sole.

Gallery

Footnotes

References

Citations

External links 
 

 
Footwear
Folk footwear